John Eric Armstrong (born November 23, 1973) is an American serial killer who was convicted of killing five female sex workers in Detroit, Michigan, but is believed to have murdered at least six more women between 1992 and 1999.

Early life 

John Eric Armstrong was born on November 23, 1973, in New Bern, North Carolina. His father was abusive towards Armstrong and his mother, and sexually abused Armstrong when he was a child. In 1978, Armstrong's younger brother, Michael, died at two-months-old from Sudden Infant Death Syndrome. Because of the grief caused by Michael's death, Armstrong attempted to end his life. Shortly thereafter his father left him and his mother. Armstrong did not receive treatment for his grief until 1989, a year after he was hospitalized for locking himself in a bathroom because a girl at school was pressuring him to have sex with her.

Murders 
Armstrong joined the United States Navy in 1992. His rackmates have described him as "moody." He allegedly killed his first victim in 1991, although this is not confirmed. Between 1993 and 1998, researchers believe Armstrong murdered 11 women, all of whom were prostitutes. He claims to have killed in Seattle, Washington; Hawaii; Hong Kong, China; North Carolina; Virginia; Thailand; and Singapore. He was honorably discharged from the Navy in 1999, and enrolled at Schoolcraft College in Livonia, Michigan afterwards.

Arrest and trial 
On January 2, 2000, Armstrong was questioned by police in Dearborn Heights, Michigan after he reported finding a body in a river. He claimed he felt nauseated and attempted to vomit in the river when he discovered the body of Wendy Jordan, but he was not arrested at that time. He attempted to murder Wilhelminia Drane on April 2, 2000 after she got into his Jeep, but she sprayed him with Mace and was able to flee. On April 7, he offered Devon Marcus $40 for sex and attempted to strangle him, but Marcus was able to flee as well. Following his escape, Marcus contacted police and identified Armstrong as his captor. On April 10, police found three bodies in a railroad yard in southwest Detroit. All of the victims had been prostitutes who were strangled to death and left in sexually provocative positions. They were later identified as Robbin Brown, Rose Marie Felt, and Kelly Jean Hood. On April 12, police arrested Armstrong for the murder of Wendy Jordan after DNA evidence found with the body matched Armstrong's DNA. In March 2001, Armstrong was found guilty of first-degree murder in the death of Wendy Jordan and sentenced to life imprisonment. On June 18, 2001, he was additionally convicted of killing Kelly Jean Hood, Robbin Brown, Rose Marie Felt, and Monica Johnson. He would later explain that the reason he had left Brown, Felt, and Hood in sexually provocative positions after he killed them was “so [he] could always go back and have sex… [he] knew that they would always be there.”

See also
 List of homicides in Michigan
 List of serial killers in the United States

References 

1973 births
20th-century American criminals
American prisoners sentenced to life imprisonment
American people convicted of murder
American serial killers
Criminals from North Carolina
Living people
Male serial killers
Military personnel from North Carolina
Necrophiles
People convicted of murder by Illinois
People convicted of murder by Michigan
People from New Bern, North Carolina
Prisoners sentenced to life imprisonment by Michigan
United States Navy sailors